This is a list of airports in South Africa, grouped by type and sorted by location.

Most of the largest airports are owned by the Airports Company of South Africa these include all the international airports except for Lanseria International Airport which is privately owned. Most other public airports are owned by local municipalities although there are also a significant number of privately owned airports. Some South African Air Force bases share the airfields of public airports. In the case of Air Force Base Hoedspruit part of the base has been leased to a private company as a public airport.



Airports 
Airport names shown in bold indicate the airport has scheduled passenger service on commercial airlines.
ICAO codes link to a page of aeronautical charts at the South African Civil Aviation Authority website.

See also 
 List of airports by ICAO code: F#FA – South Africa
 List of bases of the South African Air Force
 List of South African airports by passenger movements
 Transport in South Africa
 Wikipedia:WikiProject Aviation/Airline destination lists: Africa#South Africa

Notes

References

External links 

 South African Civil Aviation Authority
 South African Airports
 Aeronautical charts
 Unverified aerodrome data – unlicensed aerodromes in South Africa, generally without scheduled service
 South African Air Force Bases
 
 
 . Last Updated 2014. Airports have designator in column 4.
 
 
 

 
South Africa
Airports
Airports
South Africa